Hodo Gap is a gap in the U.S. state of Georgia.

Hodo Gap was named after one Mr. Hodo, a local trader.

References

Landforms of Talbot County, Georgia
Valleys of Georgia (U.S. state)